Cindy Fisher is an American stage, film and television actress.

She is probably best known for the role of Rebecca in the soap opera The Young and the Restless, in which she starred in the early 1980s. While working on the show she met actor Doug Davidson, who became her husband in 1984. They have two children, Calyssa and Caden. After The Young and the Restless she starred in several films and TV movies, including leading roles in the drama Liar's Moon (1982), alongside Matt Dillon, and in the television film Intimate Agony (1983), one of the first movies to be themed on the disease herpes. She was featured in the soap opera Days of Our Lives, in which she played the role of Patti Griffin between 1978 and 1979 and the role of Diane Parker in 1984.

Her other film credits include roles in Bad Ronald (1974), Hometown U.S.A. (1979), The Blues Brothers (1980), Airplane II: The Sequel (1982), and The Stone Boy (1984). Her stage work includes Cat on a Hot Tin Roof, Annie Get Your Gun, Summer and Smoke, and Twelfth Night.

References

External links 
 

Living people
American soap opera actresses
American film actresses
American stage actresses
American television actresses
21st-century American actresses
Year of birth missing (living people)